Killough railway station was on the Downpatrick, Killough and Ardglass Railway, which ran from Downpatrick to Ardglass in Northern Ireland.

History

Opened by the Downpatrick, Killough and Ardglass Railway, it became part of the Belfast and County Down Railway. The station closed to passengers in 1950, by which time it had been taken over by the Ulster Transport Authority.

The site today 
The station building and goods shed still exist with the former used for residential purposes.

References 

 
 
 

Disused railway stations in County Down
Railway stations opened in 1892
Railway stations closed in 1950
1892 establishments in Ireland
1950 disestablishments in Northern Ireland
Railway stations in Northern Ireland opened in the 19th century